Daniel Lawrence Taylor is a British actor and comedy writer. He appeared in several sitcoms including Uncle, How Not to Live Your Life, and Hunderby. He starred in ITV2's 2015 comedy Cockroaches and had a small role in The Inbetweeners. He is one half of the comedy duo Ginger & Black (with Eri Jackson). Taylor created, wrote and starred in the ITV2 sitcom Timewasters. The first series of Timewasters aired in 2017 and the second series aired in spring 2019. Series 1 was nominated for a BAFTA in 2018 for Best Scripted Comedy. In 2018, Taylor was named as a BAFTA Breakthrough Brit.

References
 Also Radio 4 comedy 'Lobby Land' Political sitcom.

External links

Living people
British male actors
Year of birth missing (living people)
Place of birth missing (living people)
Black British male actors
English people of Ghanaian descent